The Confederated Salish and Kootenai Tribes of the Flathead Reservation (Montana Salish: Séliš u Ql̓ispé, Kutenai: k̓upawiȼq̓nuk) are a federally recognized tribe in the U.S. state of Montana. The government includes members of several Bitterroot Salish, Kootenai and Pend d'Oreilles tribes and is centered on the Flathead Indian Reservation.

The peoples of this area were named Flathead Indians by Europeans who came to the area. The name was originally applied to various Salish peoples, based on the practice of artificial cranial deformation by some of the groups, though the modern groups associated with the Flathead Reservation never engaged in it.

Early days of the Salish 
The Salish (Flatheads) initially lived entirely east of the Continental Divide but established their headquarters near the eastern slope of the Rocky Mountains. Occasionally, hunting parties went west of the Continental Divide but not west of the Bitterroot Range. The easternmost edge of their ancestral hunting forays were the Gallatin Range, Crazy Mountain, and Little Belt Ranges.

Early territory 
The Flathead and the Pend d'Oreille both agree that the Flathead once occupied a large territory on the plains east of the Rocky Mountains. This tribal homeland included the present-day counties of Broadwater, Jefferson, Deer Lodge, Silver Bow, Madison and Gallatin and parts of Lewis & Clark, Meagher and Park. This was about the time, when they got the first horses.

The tribe consisted of at least four bands. Respectively, they had winter quarters near present-day Helena, near Butte, east of Butte and in the Big Hole Valley.

Nearby peoples
Right north of the Flathead lived the Salis-Tunaxe. There was no sharp line between the two tribal territories, and the people in the border zone often intermarried. Further north lived the Kutenai-Tunaxe (Kootenai-Tunaxe). Next to them lived the Salisan tribe's common enemy, the Blackfoot. West of the Rocky Mountains held the Pend d'Oreille the territory around Flathead Lake, and south of them occupied the Semteuse a relatively small area. The numerous Shoshone semi-surrounded the Salish from northeast to southwest. It seems the Salish did not know the Comanche and Kiowa at this time. They may have been regarded as bands of Shoshone.

Later well-established plains tribes like the Sarsi, Assiniboine, Cree, Crow, Gros Ventre, Arapaho, Cheyenne and Sioux lived far away. They were unknown to the Salish.

Horses and the changed life of the Salish 
The Salish got horses from the Shoshone, and the animal changed the life of the people. When they had had only dogs, the Salish had paid no special attention to the American bison, which they had hunted just like deer and elk. Newly acquired mounts made it possible to overtake the American bison and the secured meat and skins could easily be carried by packhorses. All other game lost in importance.

Before they had had horses, the Salish had lived in conical tents covered with two to four layers of sewed tule mats, depending on the season. The tipi soon replaced the old lodge. Instead of rawhide bags of many shapes and sizes, the women made parfleches from now on.

Forced west of the divide 
Both the Salish-Tunaxe and the Semteuse were almost "killed off in wars" with the Blackfoot and further reduced by smallpox. Some of the survivors took refuge among the Salish. With the near extinction of the Salish-Tunaxe, the Salish extended their hunting grounds northward to Sun River. Between 1700 and 1750, they were driven back by pedestrian Blackfoot warriors armed with fire weapons. Finally, they were forced out of the bison range and west of the divide along with the Kutenai-Tunaxe.

History 
The Flatheads lived now between the Cascade Range and Rocky Mountains. The first written record of the tribes is either from their meeting with trapper Andrew Garcia, explorer David Thompson, or the Lewis and Clark Expedition (September 4, 1805). Lewis and Clark came there and asked for horses but eventually ate the horses due to starvation. The Flatheads also appear in the records of the Roman Catholic Church at St. Louis, Missouri, to which they sent four delegations to request missionaries (or "Black Robes") to minister to the tribe. Their request was finally granted, and a number of missionaries, including Pierre-Jean De Smet, S.J., were eventually sent. The Flatheads are also located in Sula, Montana.

The tribes negotiated the Hellgate treaty with the United States in 1855. From the start, treaty negotiations were plagued by serious translation problems. A Jesuit observer, Father Adrian Hoecken, said that the translations were so poor that "not a tenth of what was said was understood by either side." But as in the meeting with Lewis and Clark, the pervasive cross-cultural miscommunication ran even deeper than problems of language and translation. Tribal people came to the meeting assuming they were going to formalize an already-recognized friendship. Non-Indians came with the goal of making official their claims to native lands and resources. Isaac Stevens, the new governor and superintendent of Indian affairs for the Washington Territory, was intent on obtaining cession of the Bitterroot Valley from the Salish. Many non-Indians were already well aware of the valley's potential value for agriculture and its relatively temperate climate in winter. Because of the resistance of Chief Victor (Many Horses), Stevens ended up inserting into the treaty complicated (and doubtless poorly translated) language that defined the Bitterroot Valley south of Lolo Creek as a "conditional reservation" for the Salish. Victor put his X mark on the document, convinced that the agreement would not require his people to leave their homeland. No other word came from the government for the next fifteen years, so the Salish assumed that they would indeed stay in their Bitterroot Valley forever.

After the 1864 gold rush in the newly established Montana Territory, pressure upon the Salish intensified from both illegal non-Indian squatters and government officials. In 1870, Victor died, and he was succeeded as chief by his son, Chief Charlot (aka Charlo, Claw of the Little Grizzly). Like his father, Charlot adhered to a policy of nonviolent resistance. He insisted on the right of his people to remain in the Bitterroot Valley. But territorial citizens and officials thought the new chief could be pressured into capitulating. In 1871, they successfully lobbied President Ulysses S. Grant to declare that the survey required by the treaty had been conducted and that it had found that the Jocko (Flathead) Reservation was better suited to the needs of the Salish. On the basis of Grant's executive order, Congress sent a delegation, led by future president James Garfield, to make arrangements with the tribe for their removal. Charlot ignored their demands and even their threats of bloodshed, and he again refused to sign any agreement to leave. U.S. officials then simply forged Charlot's "X" onto the official copy of the agreement that was sent to the Senate for ratification.

Over time, the real reason for the Hellgate treaty meetings became clear to the Salish and Pend d'Oreille people. Under the terms spelled out in the written document, the tribes ceded to the United States more than twenty million acres (81,000 km2) of land and reserved from cession about 1.3 million acres (5300 km2), thus forming the Jocko or Flathead Indian Reservation. Conditions had become intolerable for the Salish by the late 1880s, after the Missoula and Bitter Root Valley Railroad was constructed directly through the tribe's lands, with neither permission from the native owners nor payment to them. Charlot finally signed an agreement to leave the Bitterroot Valley in November 1889. Inaction by Congress, however, delayed the removal for another two years, and according to some observers, the tribe's desperation reached a level of outright starvation. In October 1891, a contingent of troops from Fort Missoula forced Charlot and the Salish out of the Bitterroot and roughly marched the small band sixty miles to the Flathead Reservation.

The three main tribes moved to the Flathead Reservation were the Bitterroot Salish, the Pend d'Oreille, and the Kootenai. The Bitterroot Salish and the Pend d'Oreille tribes spoke dialects of the same Salish language.

A dispute over off-reservation hunting between a band of Pend d'Oreilles and the state of Montana's Fish and Game department resulted in the Swan Valley Massacre of 1908.

Though marked for termination in 1953 under the House concurrent resolution 108 of the US federal Indian termination policy, the Flathead Tribes were able to resist the government's plans to terminate their tribal relationship in Congressional hearings in 1954.
In 2021 the Bison were returned to the Confederated Salish and Kootenai tribes

Demographics 

The tribe has about 6800 members with approximately 4,000 tribal members living on the Flathead Reservation as of 2013, and 2,800 tribal members living off the reservation. Their predominant religion is Roman Catholicism. 1,100 Native Americans from other tribes and more than 10,000 non-Native Americans also live on the reservation.

Politics 
As the first to organize a tribal government under the 1934 Indian Reorganization Act, the tribes are governed by a tribal council. The Tribal Council has ten members, and the council elects from within a Chairman, Vice Chairman, Secretary and Treasurer. The tribal government offers a number of services to tribal members and is the chief employer on the reservation. The tribes operate a tribal college, the Salish Kootenai College, and a heritage museum called "The People's Center" in Pablo, seat of the tribal government.

Economy 
The tribes are the biggest employer on the reservation. In 2011, they provided 65% of all jobs.

The tribes own and jointly operate a valuable hydropower dam, called Séliš Ksanka Ql'ispé Dam (formerly known as Kerr Dam). They are the first Indian nation in the United States owning a hydroelectric dam. CSKT also operates the only local electricity provider Mission Valley Power, as well as S&K Electronics (founded 1984), and the internationally operating S&K Technologies (founded 1999). Other tribal businesses are the KwaTaqNuk Resort & Casino in Polson (county seat of Lake County and most populous community on the reservation) and Gray Wolf Peak Casino in Evaro, Montana.

Geography

Aboriginal lands
The peoples of these tribes originally lived in the areas of Montana, parts of Idaho, British Columbia (Canada) and Wyoming. The original territory comprised about 22 million acres (89,000 km2) at the time of the 1855 Hellgate treaty.

Reservation lands

The Flathead Reservation in northwest Montana is over 1.3 million acres (5,300 km2) in size.

The Tribal Council represents eight districts:
Arlee District 
Dixon District
Elmo District
Hot Springs District
Pablo District
Polson District
Ronan District
St. Ignatius District
During World War II, a  Liberty Ship, the SS Chief Charlot, was named in his honor and built in Richmond, California, in 1943.

Culture
Languages
Salishan languages
Kutenai language
Historical Sites
Archaeology

Notable people

Corwin Clairmont, artist and educator
Marvin Camel, boxer, WBC & IBF Cruiserweight Champion
Debra Magpie Earling, author
Terese Marie Mailhot, author
D'Arcy McNickle (1904 – 1977), noted writer, Native American activist and anthropologist
Jaune Quick-to-See Smith, artist

See also
 Alameda's hot springs retreat
 Kootenai Tribe of Idaho
 Ktunaxa Kinbasket Tribal Council

References

Further reading

 Bigart, Robert, and Clarence Woodcock. In the Name of the Salish & Kootenai Nation: The 1855 Hell Gate Treaty and the Origin of the Flathead Indian Reservation. Pablo, Mont: Salish Kootenai College Press, 1996. 
 Confederated Salish and Kootenai Tribes. Ktunaxa Legends. Pablo, Mont: Salish Kootenai College Press, 1997. 
 Confederated Salish and Kootenai Tribes. The Salish People and the Lewis and Clark Expedition. Lincoln: University of Nebraska Press, 2005. 
 Confederated Salish and Kootenai Tribes of the Flathead Reservation. A Brief History of the Flathead Tribes. St. Ignatius, Mont: Flathead Culture Committee, Confederated Salish & Kootenai Tribes, 1979. 
 Johnson, Olga Weydemeyer. Flathead and Kootenay; The Rivers, the Tribes, and the Region's Traders. Northwest historical series, 9. Glendale, Calif: A. H. Clark Co, 1969. 
 Salish Kootenai College. Challenge to survive : history of the Salish tribes of the Flathead Indian Reservation (2008). Volume 1, From Time Immemorial, Traditional Life. Volume 2, Three Eagles and Grizzly Bear Looking Up Period, 1800-1840. Volume 3, Victor and Alexander Period, 1840-1870.

External links

Official site of the Confederated Tribes
Official site of Nkwusm Salish Language Institute
Treaty of Hellgate (1855)
Edward S. Curtis's The North American Indian, Northwestern University, Digital Library Collections, "Kalispel", Page 51
Flathead Indians historical and genealogical resources, Family Search

 
Native American tribes in Idaho
Native American tribes in Montana
Native American tribes in Wyoming
Ktunaxa governments
Interior Salish
Federally recognized tribes in the United States